Gulikovka is a rural locality (a selo) in Arkharinsky District, Amur Oblast, Russia. Population: 14 as of 2018.

Geography 
Gulikovka is located on the left bank of the Bureya River, 58 km north of Arkhara (the district's administrative centre) by road. Domikan (village) is the nearest rural locality.

References

Rural localities in Arkharinsky District